Coming Out Stories is an American reality television series that premiered on the LGBT-themed Logo television network with its first episode on February 16, 2006. Each episode follows a particular gay or lesbian individual's preparation and coming out to a particular person or group of people. The shows were produced by four time Academy Award nominees Kirk Simon and Karen Goodman.

So far, there has been one season, which consisted of eight episodes, that ended on October, 2006 and has subsequently been rerun periodically. Episodes are also available on Logo's official website, and can be downloaded in the iPod format via iTunes.

The series won a 2007 Insight Award and was nominated for the  National Association for Multi-Ethnicity in Communications (NAMEC) award that honors those who create outstanding content that depicts the world's rich, multi-ethnic experiences.

Episode list

External links 
 
 

2000s American reality television series
2006 American television series debuts
2006 American television series endings
Logo TV original programming
2000s LGBT-related reality television series
2000s American LGBT-related television series